Língāo County (formerly romanised as Limko or Limkao) is an administrative district in Hainan province, China. It is one of 4 counties of Hainan. Its postal code is 571800, and in 1999 its population was 399,057 people.

Climate

See also
 List of administrative divisions of Hainan

References

 
 Official website (Chinese)

 
Lingao County